Silvia Colloca (born 23 July 1977) is an Italian-Australian actress, opera singer, cookbook author, and TV cookery show personality. She has published six cookbooks.

Life and career
Colloca was born in Milan to Loredana and Mario Colloca. Her only major film role was in Van Helsing, in which she played Verona, one of Dracula's brides. On 25 September 2004, at the medieval castle of Montalto in Tuscany, Italy, she married the Australian actor Richard Roxburgh who played Dracula in that film. They have two sons and a daughter. The family currently resides in Sydney.

Colloca is an opera-trained mezzo-soprano and worked as a musical theatre performer in Italy before becoming a film actress. She appeared in 2015 as Orfeo in Gluck's Orfeo ed Euridice in Sydney, and as The Queen in Lindy Hume's production of Snow White for Opera Queensland and La Boite theatre in 2016. Her debut album, Sing Like an Italian, was released by Decca in October 2022. She performs four numbers alongside arias and art songs by international stars singers. The album made its debut at No. 1 on the ARIA Core Classical and Classical/Crossover charts.

Television
Made in Italy with Silvia Colloca, an Australian 10-part TV series, premiered on SBS TV in November 2014, coinciding with the publication of the book of the same name. Colloca took a film crew home to meet her Italian family, showcasing three picturesque regions of Italy, Abruzzo where her family is from, Marche, and Molise, using her mother's kitchen to present cucina povera (peasant cuisine).

Silvia's Italian Table, an eight part reality and cooking series debuted on ABC on 6 October 2016. In each episode, Colloca invites a group of celebrities to cook and eat with her and engage in entertaining and intelligent conversation. Guests featured are Kathy Lette, Lisa McCune, Tom Gleeson, Magda Szubanski, Matt Moran, Ken Done, Sarah Ferguson, Merrick Watts, Claire Hooper, Amanda Vanstone, Pia Miranda and Ian Thorpe.

Cook Like an Italian, an Australian 10-part TV series, premiered on SBS Food in November 2020. A second season premiered in April 2021 and third season in May 2022.

Filmography
 Casomai (2002) as Cannes award hostess
 Van Helsing (2004) as Verona
 The Detonator (2006) as Nadia Cominski
 Virgin Territory (2007) as Sister Lisabetta
 Lesbian Vampire Killers (2009) as Carmilla
 Out of the Night (2010) as Roberta
 Triple Happiness (2010)
 L'Apocalisse delle scimmie (2012) as Tossica
 Nerve (2013) as Elena
 Dante's Inferno Animated (2013, Short) as Beatrice (voice: Italian version)
 Little Tornadoes (2022) as Maria

Published works

 Silvia's Cucina, Penguin 2013.
 Made in Italy, Penguin 2014.
 La Dolce Vita, Penguin 2016.
 Love Laugh Bake, Pan Macmillan 2018.

Music career
In 2022, Colloca signed with Decca Records and released Sing Like An Italian in October 2022. The album peaked at number 1 on the ARIA Classic Album Chart and was the second biggest album in that genre in Australia in 2022.

Albums

References

External links

 
 
 
 

1977 births
Italian film actresses
Italian mezzo-sopranos
Chefs of Italian cuisine
Living people
Actresses from Milan
Australian television chefs
Women chefs
21st-century Italian singers
21st-century Italian women singers